Broadway High School is an alternative secondary school located in San Jose, California which serves students within the San Jose Unified School District.  The school was first opened in 1976.

References

External links
 Broadway High School official webpage
 Broadway High School profile provided by greatschools.net

Educational institutions established in 1976
High schools in San Jose, California
Public high schools in California
Alternative schools in California
1976 establishments in California